Adesmia aphanantha is a perennial herb found in South America.

References

Flora of South America
aphanantha
Taxa named by Carlo Luigi Spegazzini